Mount Elizabeth Hospital, known colloquially as Mount E, is a 345-bed private hospital in Singapore operated by Parkway Health. Construction began in 1976 and the hospital officially opened on 8 December 1979. The hospital specialises in cardiology, oncology, and neuroscience, among other tertiary services. It is also recognised as a multi-organ transplant speciality hospital. Since 1995, it has been owned by Parkway Holdings Ltd.

The hospital is accredited by Joint Commission International and is located in Singapore's Orchard Road, on Mount Elizabeth. It is the first private hospital in Singapore to perform open-heart surgery and to establish a nuclear medicine centre.

The Royal Family of Brunei built a Royal Suite in the hospital for their own use. It was later made available for use by other patients.

In 2016 the cost of a bed in a four-bed ward was $276 a night. A single room was $640 a night.

The adjacent Mount Elizabeth Medical Centre (MEMC) houses clinics with private medical specialists only. Doctors have to be specialists accredited by the Singapore Medical Council in order to practice in Mount Elizabeth Medical Centre. They practice in 31 specialities in total, including anaesthesiology, cardiology, cardiothoracic surgery, dental specialties, endocrinology, gastroenterology, general surgery, medical oncology, neurology, obstetrics and gynaecology, orthopaedic surgery, otorhinolaryngology, paediatric medicine, plastic surgery, renal medicine, respiratory medicine, and urology. Consultation and treatment rates vary per condition, clinic, and specialist.

The medical centre caters to patients of all ages from Singapore, Southeast Asia, and international patients from all countries visiting Singapore. Staff who understand multiple languages such as Indonesian, Russian, and Malay are available on-site to provide translations. The medical centre also contains pharmacies and shops on the second floor.

References

External links

Hospital buildings completed in 1979
Hospitals in Singapore
Newton, Singapore
Hospitals established in 1976
1976 establishments in Singapore
20th-century architecture in Singapore